J. Max Bond Sr. (1902–1991) was an American educator who was President of the University of Liberia during the 1950s.

Bond was born in Nashville, Tennessee, the son of a Congregational minister named James Bond and Jane Alice Bond (née Brown). He attended Roosevelt College in Chicago, the University of Pittsburgh, and the University of Southern California.

He was married to Ruth Clement Bond (née Ruth E. Clement), and their collected papers are held at Columbia University's Rare Book and Manuscript Library.  Bond had three children, Jane Emma Bond, J. Max Bond Jr. and George Clement Bond. Son J. Max Bond Jr. was a notable architect, and son George Clement Bond was the William F. Russell Professor of Anthropology and Education at Teachers College, Columbia University. Bond's brother was University president Horace Mann Bond and his nephew was the civil-rights leader Julian Bond.

Career
Bond was Dean of Dillard University from 1938 to 1940, and an Administrator at the Tuskegee Institute from 1940 to 1944. He then ran the Inter-American Educational Foundation from 1944 to 1947, and the School of Education at Clark Atlanta University before becoming President of the University of Liberia, a post he held from 1950 to 1954.

External links
New York Times obituary
 J. Max and Ruth Clement Bond Papers at the Rare Book & Manuscript Library at Columbia University

1902 births
1991 deaths
Presidents of the University of Liberia
People from Nashville, Tennessee
University of Pittsburgh alumni
Roosevelt University alumni
University of Southern California alumni
Dillard University faculty
Tuskegee University faculty
Clark Atlanta University faculty
American expatriates in Liberia